Nasi jamblang (Cirebonese: sega jamblang) is a typical food of Cirebon, West Java. The "jamblang" term comes from the name of the region to the west of the city of Cirebon, where food vendors first sold the dish. A characteristic feature of the dish is the usage of teak leaves to pack the rice. The dish is served buffet-style.

History 
Nasi jamblang is a traditional Cirebonese food originally served to the forced labourers who built the Great Post Road from Anyer to Panarukan which passes through Cirebon Regency during the Dutch colonial era.

Menu 
Dishes available usually include chili fries, tofu, vegetables, lung/liver/meat stews, satay, potatoes, fried scrambled eggs, stewed chili fish, salted fish, and tempeh.

See also

 Empal gentong
Warung

References 

Cirebonese cuisine
Javanese cuisine
Indonesian rice dishes